Las Vegas Ballpark is a baseball stadium in Summerlin South, Nevada in the Las Vegas Valley. It is the home field for the Las Vegas Aviators of the Pacific Coast League. The stadium is owned by the Howard Hughes Corporation. Las Vegas Ballpark is located in Downtown Summerlin near the intersection of South Pavilion Center Drive and Summerlin Center Drive next to City National Arena and across the street from the Downtown Summerlin shopping center. Construction of the $150 million stadium began in 2018 and was completed in time for the Aviators' 2019 season. It replaced the team's previous home at Cashman Field, where the team had resided since 1983.

History

Background
The decision to build a new stadium for the team, then known as the 51s, came on the back of many issues both the 51s and Minor League Baseball had with the team's previous stadium, Cashman Field. Considered state-of-the-art when it opened in 1983, it had fallen far behind the times. Players and staff criticized the facility noting poor conditions in the playing surface, bullpens, and clubhouse. The weight room was smaller when compared to other Triple-A stadiums, with infielder Ty Kelly calling it "basically just a room... not an actual weight room". The batting cage was also a point of concern for the players; it was a single lane and only accessible by walking out of the clubhouse to the parking lot. Johnny Monell described the cage as making him feel like he was "back in high school again," not one level below the major leagues. During a 51s game on August 22, 2015, the stadium sewage system backed up, causing raw sewage to flow into the dugouts. The smell was so strong that players were forced to watch the rest of the game from chairs on the field. Team president and chief operating officer Don Logan said, "It's disappointing that Vegas has the worst facility in our league when we have such a great town with the greatest hotels, the greatest dining, the greatest shopping. It's not becoming of this community to have a place like this."

Pacific Coast League commissioner Branch Barrett Rickey expressed his concerns about the feasibility of the continuous usage of Cashman Field as a Triple-A ballpark. In a letter to the Las Vegas Convention and Visitors Authority which owned and operated the facility, he wrote that Cashman Field had long since reached the end of its useful life, and a number of MLB teams had opted to place their Triple-A teams "in far less appropriate markets" than Las Vegas. He added that Cashman Field needed "many tens of millions of dollars" to keep it at something approaching Triple-A standards, and even those would not have been enough to make it "an optimal long-term solution" as a Triple-A venue. For much of the time since the San Diego Padres ended their 18-year affiliation with what was then known as the Las Vegas Stars in 2000, Las Vegas had been considered an affiliate of last resort for most MLB teams, something Las Vegas Ballpark sought to fix.

Approval and groundbreaking
In April 2013, the team was purchased by Summerlin Las Vegas Baseball Club LLC, a joint venture of Howard Hughes Corp. and Play Ball Owners Group, including investors Steve Mack, Bart Wear and Chris Kaempfer, with intentions of moving it to a new stadium in Summerlin. In October 2017, the Las Vegas Convention and Visitors Authority approved a 20-year, $80 million naming rights agreement to help pay for a new $150 million 10,000-seat ballpark.

The official groundbreaking was held on February 13, 2018. By April 2018, excavation was 85 percent complete with nearby grading for parking lots about 90 percent complete. By June 2018, it was on schedule to be completed before the 2019 season.

Opening
Reservations for tickets began in July 2018. The schedule was announced in August 2018, with the home opener on April 9, 2019. On April 6, the stadium had a soft opening hosting a NIAA Sunset 4A Region high school baseball game between Palo Verde High School and Centennial. The Aviators formally opened the ballpark with a 10–2 win against the Sacramento River Cats on April 9 before a sellout crowd of 11,036. Las Vegas secured the win with a five-run second inning in which Skye Bolt scored the eventual winning run when he came home on a fielding error. Aviators pitchers Chris Bassitt and Daniel Mengden combined to strikeout 14 Sacramento batters. The first home run in ballpark history was hit by Zach Green of the Sacramento River Cats on April 11 in the top of the eighth inning. In the same game, Sean Murphy hit the first Aviators' home run in ballpark history in the bottom of the eighth inning.

Amenities and layout
Las Vegas Ballpark includes 22 suites, 400 club-level seats and 350 party deck seats, a center field pool, kids' zone, and several bars. The ballpark features 4Topps Premium Seating breathable mesh seats, with 8,200 seats installed it is the first stadium in sports history with all seats made from breathable mesh. The frames of these seats contain fiberglass, which has since delaminated causing skin irritation to some spectators. The ballpark's total seating capacity is 10,000. There is a concourse that wraps around the playing field. The field is recessed below the street-level concourse so it can be viewed from the entrances and seats.

There are LED ribbon boards installed on the facings of each side of the upper deck; these are used to display the inning, score, count, and advertisements. The stadium also has indoor batting cages, a weight room and a rehabilitation center. The bullpen for each team is in right field.

See also

 Allegiant Stadium, the home of the National Football League's Las Vegas Raiders and NCAA's UNLV Rebels football
 T-Mobile Arena, the home of the National Hockey League's Vegas Golden Knights
 Sports in the Las Vegas metropolitan area

References

External links
 Official website
 Las Vegas Aviators web site

Las Vegas Aviators
Minor league baseball venues
Baseball venues in Nevada
Sports venues in Las Vegas
Sports venues completed in 2019
Buildings and structures in Summerlin, Nevada
Pacific Coast League ballparks